Sar Tang-e Bard Gadun (also Romanized as Sartang-e Bard Gādūn; also known as Sar Tang and Sartang-e Bālā) is a village in Kuh Mareh Khami Rural District, in the Central District of Basht County, Kohgiluyeh and Boyer-Ahmad Province, Iran. At the 2006 census, its population was 55, in 12 families.

References 

Populated places in Basht County